These are the results for the 30th edition of the Ronde van Nederland cycling race, which was held from August 13 to August 18, 1990. The race started in Groningen (Groningen (province)) and finished after 911.1 kilometres in Gulpen (Limburg).

Stages

13-08-1990: Groningen-Groningen (Prologue), 5.5 km

14-08-1990: Groningen-Raalte, 212 km

15-08-1990: Raalte-Dordrecht, 209 km

16-08-1990: Dordrecht-Eindhoven, 197 km

17-08-1990: Eindhoven-Maastricht, 108 km

17-08-1990: Maastricht-Maastricht (Time Trial), 7.6 km

18-08-1990: Eindhoven-Maastricht, 172 km

Final classification

External links
Wielersite Results

Ronde van Nederland
August 1990 sports events in Europe
1990 in road cycling
1990 in Dutch sport